is a national park on the Rishiri Island, Rebun Island, and a coastal area from Wakkanai to Horonobe at the north-western tip of Hokkaidō, Japan. Areas of the park cover . The park is noted for its alpine flora and views of volcanic mountains and areas formed by marine erosion. The park is surrounded by fishing grounds, and the coastal areas of the park are rich in kelp. The coastal areas of the national park can be accessed from Japan National Route 40, known as the Wakkanai National Highway, and the Rishiri and Rebun are accessible by ferry from Wakkanai.

Geography

Rishiri Island
, separated from Hokkaido by the Rishiri Channel, was formed by the cone-shaped extinct volcanic peak of Mount Rishiri.

Rebun Island
Rebun reaches its highest altitude at Rebundake.

Sarobetsu Plain
The  is a marshy floodplain on the Sea of Japan formed by the Teshio River and Sarobetsu River. The Sarobetsu Plain has a subarctic climate and consists of large peat bogs. The Sarobetsu Plain was added to the Ramsar List of Wetlands of International Importance in 2005 as part of the Ramsar Convention, an international treaty for the conservation of wetlands.

See also
List of national parks of Japan
Rishiri Island
Rebun Island
Sarobetsu Plain

References

External links
 https://web.archive.org/web/20120204040019/http://www.biodic.go.jp/english/jpark/np/risiri_e.html
 

National parks of Japan
Parks and gardens in Hokkaido
Protected areas established in 1974